The demographics of Poland constitute all demographic features of the population of Poland, including population density, ethnicity, education level, the health of the populace, economic status, religious affiliations, and other aspects of the population.

According to the 2011 census by the Polish Central Statistical Office (GUS), at the end of 2011, Poland had a population of 38,538,447, which translates into an average population density of 123 people/km2 (urban ; rural ). 61.5% of the Polish population lives in urban areas, a number which is slowly diminishing. Poland is the 37th most populous country in the world (8th in Europe, with 5.4% of the European population). The total population of Poland is almost stagnant (population growth was 0.08%). In 2018, the average life expectancy was 77.9 years; 74.1 for men and 82 for women. Population distribution is uneven.

Ethnically, Poland used to be one of, if not the most multi-ethnic countries in Europe before World War Two and it hosted the largest Jewish community in Europe with Warsaw being home to the second largest community of people of Jewish origin after New York. After war, Poland became an ethnically homogenous country but this has been changing in recent years as large cities have been attracting migrant workers from Eastern Europe. For example, already in 2017 (i.e. before 2022 Russian Invasion of Ukraine), 10% of the population of Wroclaw (4th largest city in Poland) was Ukrainian; this jumped to 23% in a few months after 2022 war in Ukraine. In connection with the Russian invasion of Ukraine on 24 February 2022, as part of the Russian-Ukrainian war, by 2 August 2022, more than 10.4 million Ukrainian refugees left the territory of Ukraine, moving to the countries closest to the west of Ukraine, of which more than 5.1 million people fled to neighboring Poland. The number of Ukrainians refugees who continued living in Poland instead of moving to other countries is large and robust estimates using social security number registrations and geodata indicate that Ukrainian population in major Polish cities ranges between 15% - 25% of their total population .

A number of censuses have assessed this data, including a national census in 2002, and a survey by the Helsinki Foundation for Human Rights (HFHR), which confirmed there are numerous autochthonous ethnic groups in Poland. Estimates by INTEREG and Eurominority present a similar demographic picture of Poland, but they provide estimates only for the most numerous of these ethnic groups.

Like many nations with falling birth rates and considerable emigration, Poland is ageing. In 1950, the median age was 25.8; today it is 41.7, and if current trends continue, it may be 51 by 2050. As the population is ageing, it also started to decline in the 1990s mainly due to low birth rates and continued emigration overseas, which impacted the local economy; however, this has started to change, with the Polish government encouraging citizens to return to Poland with increased wage incentives. The number of children born in Polish families (TFR of 1.31, down from 2 in 1990) is one of the lowest in Central Europe, but has started to increase in recent years.

History

For many centuries, until the end of World War II in 1945, the population of Poland included many significant ethnic minorities.

Twentieth century 
The population of Poland decreased by about six million due to the losses sustained during the Holocaust and German occupation during World War II (1939-1945), and Poland became one of the most ethnically homogeneous areas in Europe (next to the populations of Slovakia and the Czech Republic) as a result of radically altered borders and population expulsions at the end of and after the war. The post-war population movements were accompanied by waves of forced migrations ordered by the Soviet and Polish communist authorities, including the transfers of sizable Polish populations (1944–1946) from Poland's pre-war eastern territories, which were incorporated into the Soviet Union, the expulsion of ethnic Ukrainians to the USSR (1944–1946), Operation Vistula (1947), and the expulsion of Germans (1945–1950) from former German provinces awarded to Poland.

Recent trends 
According to GUS, about 38,325,000 people live in Poland; however, the same report states that the number of residents living in the country all the time is approximately 37,200,000, with 1,125,000 people living abroad for 6 to 7 months or more. It means that the permanent population may be correspondingly smaller.

In the 21st century, many Poles migrated following Poland's accession to the European Union in 2004 and the opening of the EU's labor market, with approximately 2 million (primarily young) Poles taking up jobs abroad.

Population

Demographic statistics according to the World Population Review in 2019.
One birth every 2 minutes
One death every 1 minutes
Net loss of one person every 7 minutes
One net migrant every 53 minutes

Fertility

The total fertility rate is the number of children born per woman. It is based on fairly good data for the entire period. Sources: Our World In Data and Gapminder Foundation.

Birth rate
9.3 births/1,000 population (2018 est.) Country comparison to the world: 202nd

Total fertility rate

1.36 children born/woman (2018 est.) Country comparison to the world: 214th

Mother's mean age at first birth

27.4 years (2014 est.)

Life expectancy

Source: UN World Population Prospects

Age structure 

0-14 years: 14.8% (male 2,924,077 /female 2,762,634)
15-24 years: 10.34% (male 2,040,043 /female 1,932,009)
25-54 years: 43.44% (male 8,431,045 /female 8,260,124)
55-64 years: 13.95% (male 2,538,566 /female 2,819,544)
65 years and over: 17.47% (male 2,663,364 /female 4,049,281) (2018 est.)

Median age

total: 41.1 years. Country comparison to the world: 44th
male: 39.4 years
female: 42.8 years (2018 est.)

Vital statistics

Vital statistics from 1921 to 1938

After World War II

Current vital statistics

Employment and income 
Unemployment, youth ages 15–24
total: 17.7%. Country comparison to the world: 74th
male: 17.4%
female: 18% (2016 est.)

Population density and urban areas 

Urbanization

urban population: 60.1% of total population (2018)
rate of urbanization: -0.25% annual rate of change (2015-20 est.)

Demographics by town

Demographics by voivodeship

Immigration
Immigration to Poland has only picked up recently after 2014, when unemployment started falling and more workforce was needed. Most migration is temporary, with workers arriving for 3 to 12 months and then returning home with the earned money. Some of them stay long enough to acquire permanent and long-term stay permits (table below), but the actual amount of immigrants in Poland is far higher.

Most immigrants are hired using short-term work registrations, which are an easier way for employers to hire foreigners, than work permits, and only apply to workers from 6 former CIS countries. Between 2007 and 2017, they figured as a "Declaration of intention to entrust work to a foreigner", though it led to numerous abuses, since after submitting the statement, employers were not obliged to report whether the foreigner had come, and whether he had taken the job. Migrants would sometimes take up different work than previously indicated, use the permit to move to Western Europe, or not arrive at all. On 1 January 2018, it was replaced by "Declaration of entrusting work to a foreigner". Since then, employers are obliged to report the fact that the migrant has taken up employment. The change limits the comparability of the data from the previous periods.

Since January 2018, employers may hire foreigners on a seasonal work permit, used specifically for agricultural and tourism-related work. In 2020, 60,8% of hired foreigners were women, 42% were under 35 years old, and most worked in Poland from 31 to 90 days. The vast majority of migrants come from Ukraine, as well as Belarus, Moldova, and Georgia, since the law doesn't require the employer to look for potential Polish workers before hiring a foreigner from said countries.

Ethnic groups

Religions

Languages

Polish 97.8%, other and unspecified 2.2% (2002 census)

See also
 Health in Poland
 Polish diaspora
 Statistics Poland

Notes

References

External links
Statistics Poland
CIA World Factbook 2004
The Protection of National Minorities in Poland report by Helsinki Foundation for Human Rights
Internationales Institut für Nationalitätenrecht und Regionalismus 

Demographics of Poland
Society of Poland
Articles with accessibility problems